The Mississippi Department of Education (MDE) is the state education agency of Mississippi. It is headquartered in the former Central High School Building at 359 North West Street in Jackson.

The State Superintendent of Education is Carey M. Wright.

Operations
In August 2015 smoke from a fire in a nearby hotel, as well as water resulting from the incident, damaged the Central High building, so the MDE temporarily moved its headquarters to the South Pointe Business Park in Clinton. The headquarters were scheduled to move back on July 25, 2016.

Structure

State Superintendent 
The constitution designates the state superintendent the chief administrative officer of the Department of Education.

Mississippi Board of Education 
The Mississippi Board of Education is responsible for setting public education policy, monitoring school funding and appointing the State Superintendent of Education. The nine-member Board is appointed according to the rules in the Mississippi Constitution.

Superintendents
Henry R. Pease (1869 - 1873) 
T. W. Cardozo (1873 -1876)
Thomas S. Gathright (1876)
James Argyle Smith (1877 - 1885)
J. R. Preston (1885 - 1895)
A. A. Kincannon (1896 - 1898)
Henry L. Whitfield (1898 - 1900)
J. N. Powers
W. H. Smith
Robert P. Taylor

References

Works cited

External links

 Mississippi Department of Education
  (1999-?)
  (1996-)

Public education in Mississippi
State departments of education of the United States
State agencies of Mississippi